In electronics, acoustics, and related fields, the waveform of a signal is the shape of its graph as a function of time, independent of its time and magnitude scales and of any displacement in time. Periodic waveforms are those that vary periodically – they repeat regularly at consistent intervals.

In electronics, the term is usually applied to periodically varying voltages, currents, or electromagnetic fields.  In acoustics, it is usually applied to steady periodic sounds — variations of pressure in air or other media.  In these cases, the waveform is an attribute that is independent of the frequency, amplitude, or phase shift of the signal.  The term can also be used for non-periodic signals, like chirps and pulses.

The waveform of an electrical signal can be visualized in an oscilloscope or any other device that can capture and plot its value at various times, with a suitable scales in the time and value axes.  The electrocardiograph is a medical device to record the waveform of the electric signals that are associated with the beating of the heart; that waveform has important diagnostic value.  Waveform generators, that can output a periodic voltage or current with one of several waveforms, are a common tool in electronics laboratories and workshops.

The waveform of a steady periodic sound affects its timbre.  Synthesizers and modern keyboards can generate sounds with many complicated waveforms.

Common periodic waveforms 

Sine wave: . The amplitude of the waveform follows a trigonometric sine function with respect to time.
Square wave: . This waveform is commonly used to represent digital information. A square wave of constant period contains odd harmonics that decrease at −6 dB/octave.
Triangle wave: . It contains odd harmonics that decrease at −12 dB/octave.
Sawtooth wave: . This looks like the teeth of a saw. Found often in time bases for display scanning. It is used as the starting point for subtractive synthesis, as a sawtooth wave of constant period contains odd and even harmonics that decrease at −6 dB/octave.

The Fourier series describes the decomposition of periodic waveforms, such that any periodic waveform can be formed by the sum of a (possibly infinite) set of fundamental and harmonic components. Finite-energy non-periodic waveforms can be analyzed into sinusoids by the Fourier transform.

Other periodic waveforms are often called composite waveforms and can often be described as a combination of a number of sinusoidal waves or other basis functions added together.

See also
 AC waveform
 Arbitrary waveform generator
 Crest factor
 Continuous waveform
 Envelope (music)
 Frequency domain
 Phase offset modulation
 Spectrum analyzer
 Waveform monitor
 Waveform viewer
 Wave packet

References

Further reading
Yuchuan Wei, Qishan Zhang. Common Waveform Analysis: A New And Practical Generalization of Fourier Analysis. Springer US, Aug 31, 2000 
 Hao He, Jian Li, and Petre Stoica. Waveform design for active sensing systems: a computational approach. Cambridge University Press, 2012.
 Solomon W. Golomb, and Guang Gong. Signal design for good correlation: for wireless communication, cryptography, and radar. Cambridge University Press, 2005.
 Jayant, Nuggehally S and Noll, Peter. Digital coding of waveforms: principles and applications to speech and video. Englewood Cliffs, NJ, 1984.
 M. Soltanalian. Signal Design for Active Sensing and Communications. Uppsala Dissertations from the Faculty of Science and Technology (printed by Elanders Sverige AB), 2014.
 Nadav Levanon, and Eli Mozeson. Radar signals. Wiley. com, 2004.
 Jian Li, and Petre Stoica, eds. Robust adaptive beamforming. New Jersey: John Wiley, 2006.
 Fulvio Gini, Antonio De Maio, and Lee Patton, eds. Waveform design and diversity for advanced radar systems. Institution of engineering and technology, 2012.
 John J. Benedetto, Ioannis Konstantinidis, and Muralidhar Rangaswamy. "Phase-coded waveforms and their design." IEEE Signal Processing Magazine, 26.1 (2009): 22–31.

External links

 Collection of single cycle waveforms sampled from various sources